Casey Central is a regional shopping centre located in the suburb of Narre Warren South, Victoria, approximately  south-east from the Melbourne central business district. The centre recently underwent a major redevelopment and currently includes a Kmart Discount Department store, three supermarkets and over 90 specialty stores. The centre also features a fresh food hall and a number of casual dining options.  The centre has a foot traffic count of approximately 300,000 people per month

Major stores 
 Kmart
 Woolworths
 Coles
 Aldi
 Target (Formerly)

References

Shopping centres in Melbourne
Buildings and structures in the City of Casey